Julián Marcioni (born 19 March 1998) is an Argentine professional footballer who plays as a right winger for Atlanta, on loan from Newell's Old Boys.

Career
Marcioni began his footballing career in the system of Newell's Old Boys, with his senior debut arriving in May 2018 during a Copa Argentina encounter with non-league Deportivo Rincón. In the following November, Marcioni was selected for his professional league debut by manager Omar De Felippe in a Primera División fixture against Defensa y Justicia; he was substituted on with eight minutes remaining of a goalless draw. Two further first-team appearances followed in league and cup, prior to Marcioni leaving on loan in July 2019 to Independiente Rivadavia of Primera B Nacional.

Marcioni netted goals against Nueva Chicago, Deportivo Morón, Platense and Alvarado whilst with La Lepra. August 2020 saw the forward leave Newell's on loan again, as he agreed terms with fellow second tier team Atlanta.

Career statistics
.

References

External links

1998 births
Living people
Sportspeople from Córdoba Province, Argentina
Argentine footballers
Association football wingers
Argentine Primera División players
Primera Nacional players
Newell's Old Boys footballers
Independiente Rivadavia footballers
Club Atlético Atlanta footballers